Cleveland "Cleo" Smith (born 1900) was an American baseball infielder in the Negro leagues. He played with several teams from 1922 to 1928.

References

External links
 and Baseball-Reference Black Baseball Stats Seamheads 

Baltimore Black Sox players
Lincoln Giants players
Philadelphia Tigers players
Harrisburg Giants players
Homestead Grays players
Newark Stars players
Year of death missing
Date of birth missing
Date of death missing
Baseball outfielders